Yuan River (Yuanjiang) usually refers to a tributary of the Yangtze in Hunan, China.

It may also refer to:

 Yuan River (冤水, Yuānshuǐ), a former name of the former Ji River in Shandong, China
 Yuan River (元江, Yuánjiāng), the Chinese name for the upper course of the Red River in Yunnan, China

See also
 Yuan Jiang (disambiguation)